Tik Tak Tail is an Indian flash-animated slapstick comedy television series produced by Cosmos-Maya. It premiered on 4 September 2017 on Pogo.  The show is about three characters — Tik, a rabbit; Tak, a tiger and Tail, the tiger's tail.

Premise
Tak and Tail co-operate to hunt down Tik. Tak wants to eat Tik and Tail wants the carrots from Tik. Tik escapes using his wit, sometimes creating a feud between Tak and Tail.

Characters
Tik: Tik is a sweet, yellow, smart and fast rabbit. Whenever in danger, he can burrow underground and can come up from anywhere on the terrain.
Tak: Tak is a blue tiger who is constantly trying to capture and eat Tik. He is as fast as Tik but not as smart. He has wolverine-like claws and he can pull out stripes from his body and modify them to make a weapon.
Tail: Tail is the living tail of Tak. Tail is a vegetarian and really likes carrots, which he tries to steal from Tik.
Jolly: Jolly is an Orange Elephant who is Tik's Friend and Tik often calls him Jolly Bhai.
Tikki: Tikki is a pink rabbit who is Tik's lover.
"'Pape"': Pape is brown squirrel

See also 

 List of Indian animated television series

References

2017 Indian television series debuts
2019 Indian television series endings
Indian flash animated television series
Indian children's animated comedy television series
Pogo (TV channel) original programming
Cartoon Network (Indian TV channel) original programming
Animated television series about rabbits and hares
Television series about tigers
Animated television series without speech